The Protection of Wild Mammals (Scotland) Act is an Act of the Scottish Parliament passed in February 2002, making Scotland the first part of the United Kingdom to ban traditional fox hunting and hare coursing.

Passage of the Act
The bill was introduced into the Scottish Parliament in 1999 by Mike Watson MSP with support from SNP MSP Tricia Marwick. In September 2001, the Scottish Parliament rejected a negative committee report  about the Bill from its Rural Development Committee and voted to support the general principles of the Bill. On 13 February 2002 the Parliament voted by eighty-three to thirty-six to pass the legislation to ban hunting with dogs. MSPs decided not to give compensation to those whose livelihoods or businesses might suffer as a result of the ban. The Scottish Countryside Alliance attempted to block introduction of the legislation by taking their case to the Court of Session in Edinburgh, although their appeal was not successful and in July the Judge recognised the will of the Parliament on this issue. The Act came into effect on 1 August 2002.

Impact of the ban
An article in The Guardian on 9 September 2004 reports that of the ten Scottish hunts, nine survived the ban, using the permitted exemption allowing them to use packs of hounds to flush foxes to guns (an exemption which is strongly opposed by people against hunting).

A number of convictions have taken place under the Act, two for people hunting foxes and ten for hare coursing. The only prosecution of a traditional fox hunt led to a not guilty verdict, but to a clarification of the law, with the sheriff saying that the activity of flushing foxes to guns "will require to be accompanied by realistic and one would expect, effective arrangements for the shooting of pest species. The use of what might be termed "token guns" or what was described by the Crown as paying lip service to the legislation is not available ... as a justification for the continuation of what was referred to in the evidence before me as traditional fox hunting."

There is controversy over the impact on the number of foxes killed by hunts. Hunts say that the number killed by hunts has doubled because shooting is more effective than chasing with dogs.

Since the ban, two new fox hunts have started in Scotland, the Strathappin and the Dumfriesshire and Stewartry.

2016 review
In December 2015, the Scottish Government announced that a review would be held that would look at legislation dealing with hunting with dogs, with the review to be led by Lord Bonomy. In November 2016 a report was published with various recommendations, including making amendments to the law.

See also
 Animal law
 Fox hunting legislation
 Hunting Act 2004

References

External links

 Full text of the Bill, Scottish Parliament 
 List of convictions under the Act 

Acts of the Scottish Parliament 2002
Scottish coast and countryside
Sports law
Hunting and shooting in Scotland
Hunting with hounds
Animal welfare and rights legislation in the United Kingdom